First Congregational Church is a historic church at 2 Clay Street in Malone, New York.
The third building of the congregation on the site, it was built in 1883.  The congregation was the first formed in Franklin County, NY, in 1807, with the first settled pastor in the county (Rev. Ashbel Parmelee).  The congregation erected its first church building in 1826 and replaced that first stone building with a second, of brick, in 1852.  It is this second building that is thought to have been built with passages to secret escaping slaves on their way to Canada.  One of these tunnels is extant in the basement of the current church building.  Vice President William A. Wheeler was a member of the church.

The building was added to the National Register of Historic Places in 1991.

References

Churches on the Underground Railroad
United Church of Christ churches in New York (state)
Churches on the National Register of Historic Places in New York (state)
Churches in Franklin County, New York
National Register of Historic Places in Franklin County, New York
Underground Railroad in New York (state)